The Secretary for Innovation, Technology and Industry, formerly Secretary for Innovation and Technology, is a Hong Kong Government position  created in 2015 by the Leung Chun-ying government after years-long opposition of the pan-democracy camp.

The predecessor, Secretary for Information Technology and Broadcasting, was created in 1998 by merging the previous portfolios of the Secretary for Broadcasting, Culture and Sport and the Secretary for Trade and Industry. Head of the Information Technology and Broadcasting Bureau, the secretary is responsible for managing Hong Kong's broadcasting services, developing the film industry, promoting Hong Kong's telecommunications, and providing support to the application of Information Technology within the Government. The position was abolished in July 2002.

In 2022, Carrie Lam proposed the restructuring of the Government Secretariat, expanding the Innovation and Technology Bureau into "Innovation, Technology and Industry Bureau" in response to the policy of reindustrialization of Hong Kong. After the resolution was passed in the Legislative Council, starting from 1 July 2022, the Secretary for Innovation and Technology renamed as "Secretary for Innovation, Technology and Industry". John Lee, as the next Chief Executive, appointed Dong Sun as the new secretary to the Bureau.

List of office holders
Political party:

Secretaries for Information Technology and Broadcast, 1998–2002

Technology issues were handled by the Secretary for Commerce, Industry and Technology between 2002 and 2007, and Secretary for Commerce and Economic Development between 2007 and 2015.

Secretaries for Innovation and Technology, 2015–2022

Secretaries for Innovation, Technology and Industry, 2022–present

References

External links
Organisation chart of Hong Kong Government

Development